Saberi is a Persian surname. Notable people with the surname include:

 Ali Saberi (born 1973), Iranian lawyer and disability rights activist
 Boris Bidjan Saberi (born 1978), menswear designer based in Barcelona
 Kioumars Saberi Foumani (1941–2004), Iranian satirist, writer, and teacher
 Pari Saberi (born 1932), Iranian drama and theatre director
 Roxana Saberi, (born 1977) American freelance journalist and pageant winner

Iranian-language surnames
Persian-language surnames